James Dodd (born 1 November 2000) is an English footballer who plays for Weston-super-Mare as a midfielder.

Career
Dodd began his career with Exeter City and made his first-team debut on 25 September 2018 coming on as a substitute in the 59th minute in a 2–0 win against West Ham United under-21s in the EFL Trophy in the 2018–19 season.

He signed a new 1 year contract with the club in July 2021 before making his first appearance of the 2021–22 season in a 0–0 draw with Wycombe Wanderers in the First Round of the EFL Cup, however missed a penalty in a 4–3 penalty shootout defeat.

Having joined the club on loan in the 2021–22 season, Dodd joined Weston-super-Mare on a permanent contract in May 2022.

Statistics

References

External links
James Dodd  at the Exeter City official website

2000 births
Living people
Sportspeople from Exeter
Association football midfielders
English footballers
Exeter City F.C. players
Taunton Town F.C. players
Weston-super-Mare A.F.C. players
Southern Football League players